Dmitri Yurievich Burago (Дмитрий Юрьевич Бураго, born 1964) is a leading Russian - American mathematician,  specializing in differential, Riemannian, Finsler geometry, geometric analysis, dynamical systems and applications to mathematical physics. 

He is the son of the celebrated Geometer and Russian mathematician Yuri Dmitrievich Burago, with whom he also published well known book on metric geometry. Burago studied at 45th Physics-Mathematics School. Burago received his doctorate in 1994 at Saint Petersburg State University under the supervision of Anatoly Vershik. He was at the Steklov Institute in Saint Petersburg and is now a professor at Pennsylvania State University's Center for Dynamical Systems and Geometry.

In 1992 he was awarded the prize of the Saint Petersburg Mathematical Society. In 1998 he was an Invited Speaker at the International Congress of Mathematicians in Berlin. In 2014 he was awarded the Leroy P. Steele Prize with Yuri Burago and Sergei Vladimirovich Ivanov for their book A course in metric geometry.

Selected publications

Articles
 "Periodic metrics." In: Seminar on dynamical systems, pp. 90–95. Birkhäuser, Basel, 1994. 
 with Sergei Ivanov: "Riemannian tori without conjugate points are flat." Geometric & Functional Analysis GAFA 4, no. 3 (1994): 259–269. 
 with Sergei Ivanov and Bruce Kleiner: "On the structure of the stable norm of periodic metrics." Mathematical Research Letters 4, no. 6 (1997): 791-808.
 with Michael Brin and Sergei Ivanov: "On partially hyperbolic diffeomorphisms of 3-manifolds with commutative fundamental group." Modern dynamical systems and applications 307 (2004): 312
 with Sergei Ivanov and Leonid Polterovich: "Conjugation-invariant norms on groups of geometric origin." arXiv preprint arXiv:0710.1412 (2007).

Books
 with Yuri Burago and Sergei Ivanov: A Course in Metric Geometry, American Mathematical Society 2001

References

External links
 Mathnet.ru

20th-century Russian mathematicians
21st-century Russian mathematicians
Geometers
Differential geometers
1964 births
Living people